Alexandra Slanec (born 9 December 1986 in Vienna, Austria) is an Austrian dressage rider. She represented Austria at the 2015 European Dressage Championships in Aachen, Germany where she finished 9th in team dressage and 51st in the individual dressage competition.

References

External links 
 Official Website 
 Entry FEI Database

Living people
1986 births
Austrian female equestrians
Austrian dressage riders